Hesperalbizia is a genus of flowering plants in the family Fabaceae. It belongs to the mimosoid clade of the subfamily Caesalpinioideae.

Species
Species include:
 Hesperalbizia occidentalis (Brandegee) Barneby & J.W.Grimes

References

Mimosoids
Fabaceae genera
Taxa named by James Walter Grimes
Taxa named by Rupert Charles Barneby